Marianne Aeschbacher (born 10 December 1970 in Toulouse) is a French former synchronized swimmer who competed in the 1992 and 1996 Summer Olympics.

Career records
Solo
1992 Summer Olympics, Barcelona, 18th
1993 European Aquatics Championships, Sheffield, 2nd
1994 World Aquatics Championships, Rome, 6th
1995 European Aquatics Championships, Vienna, 2nd

Duet
1989 European Aquatics Championships, Bonn, 1st (with Karine Schuler)
1992 Summer Olympics, Barcelona, 5th (with Anne Capron)
1993 European Aquatics Championships, Sheffield, 2nd (with Céline Léveque)
1994 World Aquatics Championships, Rome, 4th (with Myriam Lignot)
1995 European Aquatics Championships, Vienna, 2nd (with Myriam Lignot)

Team
1987 European Aquatics Championships, Strasbourg, 1st
1989 European Aquatics Championships, Bonn, 1st
1993 European Aquatics Championships, Sheffield, 2nd
1995 European Aquatics Championships, Vienna, 2nd
1996 Summer Olympics, Atlanta, 5th

References

1970 births
Living people
French synchronized swimmers
Olympic synchronized swimmers of France
Synchronized swimmers at the 1992 Summer Olympics
Synchronized swimmers at the 1996 Summer Olympics
Sportspeople from Toulouse